The 1968 SANFL Grand Final was an Australian rules football competition.  beat Port Adelaide by 90 to 63.

Teams

Scorecard

References 

SANFL Grand Finals
SANFL Grand Final, 1968